Pak Jong-chol (26 October, 1987, Pyeonyang) is a North Korean boxer. At the 2012 Summer Olympics, he competed in the Men's flyweight, but was defeated in the first round by Julião Henriques Neto.

References

Living people
Olympic boxers of North Korea
Boxers at the 2012 Summer Olympics
Flyweight boxers
Boxers at the 2010 Asian Games
North Korean male boxers
Sportspeople from Pyongyang

1987 births
Asian Games competitors for North Korea